The 1989 Big League World Series took place from August 12–19 in Fort Lauderdale, Florida, United States. Taipei, Taiwan defeated Maracaibo, Venezuela in the championship game. It was Taiwan's third straight championship. 

This year featured the debut of the Central America region.

Teams

Results

References

Big League World Series
Big League World Series